Marouene Guezmir (born 6 March 1974) is a Tunisian former professional footballer who played as a midfielder.

Career
In 1996, Guezmir signed for Bundesliga side SC Freiburg, where he made 22 league appearances and scored one goal and suffered injuries and relegation to the 2. Bundesliga. On 17 August 1996, he debuted for SC Freiburg during a 1–1 draw with Werder Bremen. On 3 May 1997, Guezmir scored his first goal SC Freiburg during a 2–0 win over MSV Duisburg.

References

External links
 

Living people
1974 births
Tunisian footballers
Association football midfielders
Tunisian Ligue Professionnelle 1 players
Bundesliga players
2. Bundesliga players
SC Freiburg players
Espérance Sportive de Tunis players
CA Bizertin players
Tunisian expatriate footballers
Tunisian expatriate sportspeople in Germany
Expatriate footballers in Germany